Elementary arithmetic is a branch of mathematics that deals with basic numerical operations such as addition, subtraction, multiplication, and division. It is a fundamental subject that forms the basis for more advanced mathematical concepts. Due to its low level of abstraction, elementary arithmetic is the most universally taught branch of mathematics.

Digits

Digits are the symbols used to represent the values of numbers in a numeral system. The most commonly used digits are the Western-style Arabic numerals (0, 1, 2, 3, 4, 5, 6, 7, 8, 9), which are used in the Hindu-Arabic numeral system. The Hindu–Arabic numeral system is a positional notation system that is used to represent numbers using these digits. In a positional notation system, the value of a digit is determined by its position in the number, with the value of the digit increasing as its position becomes more significant. In this type of system, the increase in value of an additional digit includes one or more multiplications with the Radix value and the result is added to the value of an adjacent digit. For example, in the numeral "123," the digit "1" has a value of one hundred (1 × 100), the digit "2" has a value of two tens (2 × 10), and the digit "3" has a value of three ones (3 × 1). The Hindu-Arabic numeral system is used worldwide and is the standard way of representing numbers in most countries.

In elementary arithmetic, students typically learn to understand the values of individual whole numbers represented using Arabic numerals with a maximum of seven digits and to perform basic operations such as addition, subtraction, multiplication, and division using Arabic numerals with a maximum of four digits per number. These concepts form the foundation for more advanced mathematical principles and are essential in everyday life. Understanding and being able to perform these operations is necessary for success in math and is a fundamental part of elementary arithmetic.

Successor function and size
In elementary arithmetic, the successor of a natural number (including zero) is the result obtained by adding 1 to that number, while the predecessor of a natural number (excluding zero) is the result obtained by subtracting 1 from that number. Every natural number has a successor, and all natural numbers (except zero) have a predecessor.

The predecessor of the successor of a number is the number itself. For instance, five is the successor of four, and four is the predecessor of five. So, the predecessor of the successor of four is four.

If a number is the successor of another number, then the first number is said to be greater than the second number. If some first number is greater than a second number and the second number is greater than a third number, then the first number is also said to be greater than the third number. For example, 5 is greater than 4, and 4 is greater than 3, so therefore 5 is greater than 3. However, 6 is greater than 5, and therefore 6 is also greater than 3. The symbol ">" is used to denote "greater than." 

This expresses the fact that the order so-defined on the natural numbers is transitive. 

If two whole numbers greater than zero are added together, then their sum is greater than either one of them. Example: three plus five equals eight, therefore eight is greater than three and eight is greater than five. The symbol for "greater than" is >.

If some first number is greater than a second number, then the second number is said to be less than (<) the first one. Examples: three is less than eight and five is less than eight. Given a pair of natural numbers, one and only one of the following cases must be true:
the first number is greater than the second one,
the first number is equal to the second one,
the first number is less than the second one.
This expresses the fact that the order so-defined on the natural numbers is total, or strongly connected.

Counting

Counting is a fundamental concept in elementary arithmetic that involves assigning a natural number to each object in a set, starting with 1 for the first object and increasing by 1 for each subsequent object. The process of counting assigns a unique natural number to each object in the set, with the exception of zero which is not assigned to any object. The number of objects in the set is known as the count and is equal to the highest natural number assigned to an object in the set. 

Counting can also be thought of as the process of tallying using tally marks, which involves making a mark for each object in a set. This method is often used for quickly counting large quantities of objects.

Counting is used in a variety of real-world situations such as counting money, measuring ingredients in a recipe, and keeping track of inventory. It is one of the key parts of elementary arithmetic, as it is important to understand the basic concept and be able to perform counting in order to achieve success in mathematics.

Example 
To count 7 objects , we can start by assigning the number 1 to the first object , and then incrementing by 1 for each subsequent object. The final number reached when counting all the objects is the count, or the number of objects in the set. This count is also known as the cardinality of the set.

While counting, it is not necessary to keep track of which numerical label corresponds to which object. Instead, we can focus on the subset of objects that have already been labeled and use that information to identify unlabeled objects. However, if we are counting individuals, it can be helpful to organize them and track the numerical labels assigned to each person. This allows us to line up the individuals in order of increasing numerical label. To do this, participants who are unsure of their positions in the line can ask each other for their numbers and then rearrange themselves accordingly.

In more advanced mathematics, the process of counting can be thought of as constructing a one-to-one correspondence (or bijection), between the elements of a set and the set {1, ..., n}, where n is a natural number. This establishes the size of the set as n.

Addition 

Addition is a mathematical operation that combines two numbers, called addends or summands, to produce a third number, called the sum. It is a fundamental operation that is taught at the elementary level and is essential for performing more complex mathematical calculations. Addition is often written using the plus sign "+" and is performed according to the following rules:

 The sum of two numbers is equal to the number obtained by adding their individual values. For example, the sum of 3 and 4 is 7, because 3 plus 4 equals 7.
 The order in which the addends are added does not affect the sum. This property, known as the commutative property of addition, states that the sum of 3 and 4 is equal to the sum of 4 and 3.
 The sum of two numbers is unique, meaning that there is only one correct answer for the sum of any given pair of numbers.
 Addition has an inverse operation, called subtraction, which can be used to find the difference between two numbers. For example, the difference between 7 and 3 is 4, because 7 minus 3 equals 4.

Addition is used in a variety of contexts, including comparing quantities, joining quantities, measuring, and separating. In addition, it can be represented using the symbol "+" and follows the commutative property, meaning that the order of the addends does not affect the sum. When the sum of a pair of digits results in a two-digit number, the tens digit is referred to as the "carry digit" in the addition algorithm. In elementary arithmetic, students typically learn to add whole numbers and decimals, and may also learn about more advanced topics such as negative numbers and fractions.

Example 
Using the numbers 653 and 274, starting with the ones column, we find that the sum of three and four is seven.

Next, the tens column. The sum of 5 and 7 is 12, which has two digits. The last digit of 12 is written under the tens column, while the first digit is written above the hundreds-column as a carry digit.

Next, the hundreds-column. The sum of 6 and 2 is 8, but the carry digit is present, which added to 8 equals 9.

There are no other digits to add, so the algorithm is finished, yielding the following equation as a result:

Subtraction

Subtraction is the process of finding the difference between two numbers, where the minuend is the number being subtracted from, and the subtrahend is the number being subtracted. It is represented symbolically by the minus sign (-). For example, the statement "five minus three equals two" can be written as 5 - 3 = 2.

Subtraction is not commutative, meaning the order of the numbers in the operation can change the result. For example, 3 - 5 is not the same as 5 - 3. In elementary arithmetic, the minuend is always larger than the subtrahend to produce a positive result. However, if the minuend is smaller than the subtrahend, the result will be negative.

In addition to finding the difference between two numbers, subtraction can also be used to separate, combine, or find quantities in other contexts. For example, "Tom has 8 apples. He gives away 3 apples. How many does he have left?" represents separation, while "Tom has 8 apples. Three of the apples are green and the rest are red. How many are red?" represents combination. In some cases, subtraction can also be used to find the total number of objects in a group, as in "Tom had some apples. Jane gave him 3 more apples, so now he has 8 apples. How many did he start with?"

There are several methods to accomplish subtraction. The method which in the United States is referred to as traditional mathematics teaches elementary school students to subtract using methods suitable for hand calculation. The particular method used varies from country to country, and within a country, different methods are in fashion at different times. Reform mathematics is distinguished generally by the lack of preference for any specific technique, replaced by guiding 2nd-grade students to invent their own methods of computation, such as using properties of negative numbers in the case of TERC.

American schools currently teach a method of subtraction using borrowing and a system of markings called crutches. Although a method of borrowing had been known and published in textbooks prior, apparently the crutches are the invention of William A. Browell, who used them in a study in November 1937. This system caught on rapidly, displacing the other methods of subtraction in use in America at that time.

Students in some European countries are taught, and some older Americans employ, a method of subtraction called the Austrian method, also known as the additions method. There is no borrowing in this method. There are also crutches (markings to aid the memory) which vary according to country.

In the method of borrowing, a subtraction problem such as 86 - 39 can be solved by borrowing a 10 from the tens place to add to the ones place in order to facilitate the subtraction. For example, to subtract 9 from 6, we can borrow a 10 from the tens place, making the problem into (70 + 16) - 39. This is indicated by crossing out the 8, writing a 7 above it, and writing a 1 above the 6. These markings are called "crutches." The 9 is then subtracted from 16, resulting in a value of 7, and the 30 is subtracted from the 70, resulting in a value of 40. The final result is 47.

The method of addition involves augmenting the subtrahend, rather than reducing the minuend, as in the borrowing method. This transforms the problem into (80 + 16) - (39 + 10). A small 1 is marked below the subtrahend digit as a reminder. The operations are then performed: 9 is subtracted from 16 to get 7, and 40 (30 + 10) is subtracted from 80 to get a result of 40. The final result is still 47.

There are two variations of the addition method, which differ in their presentation. In the first variation, we attempt to subtract 9 from 6, and then 9 from 16, borrowing a 10 and marking it near the digit of the subtrahend in the next column. In the second variation, we try to find a digit that, when added to 9, gives us 6. When this is not possible, we give 16 and carry the 10 of the 16 as a 1, marking it near the same digit as in the first method. The markings are the same in both variations, it is simply a matter of preference as to how we explain their appearance.

It is important to note that the borrowing method can become more complex in cases such as 100 - 87, where it is necessary to borrow from several columns. In this case, the minuend can be rewritten as 90 + 10 by taking a 100 from the hundreds place, making ten 10s from it, and immediately borrowing a 10 from the tens place and placing it in the ones place. This results in a value of 9 10s in the tens place and a value of 10 in the ones place.

Example 
To find the difference between the numbers 792 and 308, one must start with the ones-column, in which 2 is smaller than 8, so we must borrow 10 from 90, making 90 become 80. We add this 10 to 2, which changes the problem to 12 - 8, which is 4.

Next is the tens column. Since we took 10 from 90, it is now 80, which means we must find the difference between 80 and 0, which is just 80.

Next is the hundreds-column. The difference between 700 and 300 is 400.

The algorithm is completed and yields the result:

Multiplication
Multiplication is a mathematical operation that refers to the repetition of addition. When two numbers are multiplied together, the resulting value is called a product. The numbers being multiplied are called factors, with multiplicand and multiplier also used.

For example, if there are five bags, each containing three apples, and the apples from all five bags are placed into an empty bag, the empty bag will contain 15 apples. This can be expressed as "five times three equals fifteen" or "five times three is fifteen" or "fifteen is the product of five and three". Multiplication can be thought of as a form of repeated addition, where the first factor indicates the number of times the second factor is added together.

Multiplication is represented using the multiplication sign (×), as well as the asterisk (*) and parentheses. Therefore, the statement "five times three equals fifteen" can be written as "5 × 3 = 15", "5 * 3 = 15", or "(5)(3) = 15". In some countries and in advanced arithmetic, other symbols may be used, such as the dot (⋅). In algebra, where numbers can be symbolized with letters, the multiplication symbol may be omitted; for example, xy represents x × y.

The order in which two numbers are multiplied does not affect the result. This is known as the commutative property of multiplication. In the multiplication algorithm, the tens digit of the product of a pair of digits is referred to as the "carry digit". To multiply a pair of digits using a table, one must locate the intersection of the row of the first digit and the column of the second digit, which will contain the product of the two digits. Most pairs of digits result in two-digit numbers.

Example of a multiplication algorithm for a single-digit factor 
Using the number 729 and 3, starting on the ones-column, the product of 9 and 3 are 27. 7 is written under the ones-column and 2 is written above the tens column as a carry digit.

Next, the tens column. The product of 2 and 3 is 6, and the carry digit adds 2 to 6, so 8 is written under the tens column.

Next, the hundreds-column. The product of 7 and 3 is 21, and since this is the last digit, 2 will not be written as a carry digit, but instead beside the 1.

No digits of the multiplicand have been left unmultiplied, so the algorithm finishes, yielding the following equation as a result:

Example of a multiplication algorithm for multiple-digit factors 
Let our objective be to find the product of two numbers, 789 and 345.

First part, Starting with the ones-column, the product of 789 and 5 is 3945.

Then the tens column. We are using the multiplier 4, which is in the tens digit. This means that we are using the multiplier 40, not 4. We must add a 0 at the end of the answer because of this. The product of 789 and 40 is 31560.

Next, the hundreds-column. Since we are using the multiplier 3 and that is in the hundreds-digit, that means it is the multiplier 300, and so the product of 789 and 300 is 236700.

Second part, Now we have all of our products. To find the total product of 789 and 345, we must find the sum of all of our products.

The answer to the example is
.

Division

In mathematics, especially in elementary arithmetic, division is an arithmetic operation which is the inverse of multiplication.

Specifically, given a number a and a non-zero number b, if another number c times b equals a, that is:

then a divided by b equals c. That is:

For instance,

since
.

In the above expression, a is called the dividend, b the divisor and c the quotient. Division by zero — where the divisor is zero — is said to be either meaningless or undefined in elementary arithmetic.

Division notation
Division is most often shown by placing the dividend over the divisor with a horizontal line, also called a vinculum, between them. For example, a divided by b is written as:

This can be read verbally as "a divided by b" or "a over b". A way to express division all on one line is to write the dividend, then a slash, then the divisor, as follows:

This is the usual way to specify division in most computer programming languages since it can easily be typed as a simple sequence of characters.

A handwritten or typographical variation — which is halfway between these two forms — uses a solidus (fraction slash) but elevates the dividend and lowers the divisor, as follows:

Any of these forms can be used to display a fraction. A common fraction is a division expression where both dividend and divisor are numbers (although typically called the numerator and denominator), and there is no implication that the division needs to be evaluated further.

A more basic way to show division is to use the obelus (or division sign) in this manner:

This form is infrequent except in basic arithmetic and discouraged for more complex arithmetic, due to being ambiguous. The obelus is also used alone to represent the division operation itself, for instance, as a label on a key of a calculator.

In some non-English-speaking cultures, "a divided by b" is written . However, in English usage the colon is restricted to expressing the related concept of ratios (then "a is to b").

With a knowledge of multiplication tables, two numbers can be divided on paper using the method of long division. An abbreviated version of long division, short division, can be used for smaller divisors as well.

A less systematic method — but which leads to a more holistic understanding of division in general — involves the concept of chunking. By allowing one to subtract more multiples from the partial remainder at each stage, more free-form methods can be developed as well.

Alternatively, if the dividend has a fractional part (expressed as a decimal fraction), one can continue the algorithm past the ones' place as far as desired. If the divisor has a decimal fractional part, one can restate the problem by moving the decimal to the right in both numbers until the divisor has no fraction.

To divide by a fraction, one can simply multiply by the reciprocal (reversing the position of the top and bottom parts) of that fraction, For example:

Example
Let us find the quotient of 272 and 8. Starting with the hundreds-digit, 2 is not divisible by 8. So, we must go to the tens digit, 7, and add 20 to 7, to get 27. In order to divide 27 and 8, we must subtract the dividend by the Greatest Common Divisor (GCD), that is, the largest positive integer that divides into each of the integers. The GCD of 27 and 8 is 24. Subtracting 24 from 27 gives you 3, so 3 should be written under the tens column.

8 is bigger than 3, so we must go to the ones-digit to continue the division, in which the number is 2. We put the 3 ahead of the 2 and get 32, which is divisible by 8, and so the quotient of 32 and 8 is 4. 4 is written under the ones-column.

There are no other digits remaining, and we can check that 34 is truly the answer by multiplying the quotient with the divisor, 8, to get 272. Thus, the algorithm is complete, yielding the result:

Educational standards
Elementary arithmetic is typically taught at the primary or secondary school levels and is governed by local educational standards. In the United States and Canada, there has been debate about the content and methods used to teach elementary arithmetic. One issue has been the use of calculators versus manual computation, with some arguing that calculator use should be limited in order to promote mental arithmetic skills. Another debate has centered on the distinction between traditional and reform mathematics, with traditional methods often focusing more on basic computation skills and reform methods placing a greater emphasis on higher-level mathematical concepts such as algebra, statistics, and problem-solving.

In the United States, the 1989 National Council of Teachers of Mathematics (NCTM) standards led to a shift in elementary school curricula that de-emphasized or omitted certain topics traditionally considered to be part of elementary arithmetic, in favor of a greater focus on college-level concepts such as algebra and statistics. This shift has been controversial, with some arguing that it has resulted in a lack of emphasis on basic computation skills that are important for success in later math classes.

Generalizations

Elementary arithmetic is a branch of mathematics that involves the basic operations of addition, subtraction, multiplication, and division. These operations are typically used with real numbers, which form a field when equipped with these operations and their inverses. A field is a set of objects that can be added, subtracted, multiplied, and divided in ways that follow expected rules, such as the associative and distributive properties.

While the real numbers are a well-known example of a field, there are many other types of fields that can behave differently from the real numbers. For example, modular integer arithmetic modulo a prime number is also a field. Relaxing the rules of arithmetic even further can lead to the creation of other algebraic structures such as division rings and integral domains.

See also
Early numeracy
Elementary mathematics
Chunking (division)
Plus and minus signs
Division by zero
Real number
Imaginary number

References

External links
"A Friendly Gift on the Science of Arithmetic" is an Arabic document from the 15th century that talks about basic arithmetic.

 
Mathematics education